Richartz is a German language surname. It stems from the male given name Richard – and may refer to:
Éder Richartz (1981), retired Brazilian footballer
Johann Heinrich Richartz (1796–1861), German businessman and patron of the arts
Willy Richartz (1900–1972), German composer and conductor

References 

German-language surnames
Surnames from given names